The 2017 Zhuhai Open was a professional tennis tournament played on outdoor hard courts. It was the second (ATP) and third (ITF) editions of the tournament and was part of the 2017 ATP Challenger Tour and the 2017 ITF Women's Circuit, offering $50,000+H (ATP) and $60,000 (ITF) in prize money. It took place at the Hengqin International Tennis Center in Zhuhai, China, from 6–12 March 2017.

Men's singles main draw entrants

Seeds

 1 Rankings as of 27 February 2017.

Other entrants 
The following players received wildcards into the singles main draw:
  Bai Yan
  Te Rigele
  Wu Di
  Wu Yibing

The following player received entry into the singles main draw with a protected ranking:
  Yuki Bhambri

The following player received entry into the singles main draw with a special exempt:
  Blake Mott

The following players received entry from the qualifying draw:
  Yannick Maden
  Jaume Munar
  Lorenzo Sonego
  Yasutaka Uchiyama

Women's singles main draw entrants

Seeds 

 1 Rankings as of 27 February 2017

Other entrants 
The following players received wildcards into the singles main draw:
  Gao Xinyu
  Lu Jingjing
  Xun Fangying
  Zhang Yuxuan

The following players received entry from the qualifying draw:
  Han Na-lae
  Lesley Kerkhove
  Patty Schnyder
  Tang Haochen

Champions

Men's singles

 Evgeny Donskoy def.  Thomas Fabbiano 6–3, 6–4.

Women's singles

 Denisa Allertová def.  Zheng Saisai 6–3, 2–6, 6–4.

Men's doubles

 Gong Maoxin /  Zhang Ze def.  Ruan Roelofse /  Yi Chu-huan 6–3, 7–6(7–4).

Women's doubles

 Lesley Kerkhove /  Lidziya Marozava def.  Lyudmyla Kichenok /  Nadiia Kichenok 6–4, 6–2.

External links 
 2017 Zhuhai Open at ITFtennis.com

 
2017
2017 in Chinese tennis
2017 ITF Women's Circuit
2017 ATP Challenger Tour